Wise (formerly TransferWise) is a UK-based foreign exchange financial technology company founded by Estonian businessmen Kristo Käärmann and Taavet Hinrikus in January 2011.

History 

Wise was founded by Taavet Hinrikus (Skype's first employee) and financial consultant Kristo Käärmann. Its system has been compared to the hawala money transfer system.

In its first year of operation, transactions through Wise amounted to €10 million. In 2012, Wise was named as one of "East London's 20 hottest tech startups" by The Guardian, Start-Up of the Week by Wired UK, one of five "start-ups to watch" at Seedcamp's 2012 US Demo Day by TechCrunch, and appeared in Startups.co.uk's list of the top 100 UK start-ups of 2012. 

In April 2013, Wise stopped letting users purchase Bitcoin, citing pressure from banking providers. Independent comparison site Monito reported that Wise was on average 83% cheaper than the big four UK banks on major currency "routes", but could be up to 90% cheaper in certain specific cases.

In May 2015, Wise was ranked No. 8 on CNBC's 2015 Disruptor 50 list, and in August 2015, the company was named a World Economic Forum Tech Pioneer.

On 8 April 2017, an internal memo from British bank Santander claimed the bank would lose 84% of its revenue from its money transfer business if its charges were the same as Wise. Also in April 2017, the company announced the opening of its APAC hub in Singapore. In 2019, the company announced opening an office in Brussels. In May 2017, the company announced its customers were sending over £1 billion every month using the service, and that the company had turned profitable six years after being founded.

On 21 January 2021, Sky News reported that Wise had appointed Goldman Sachs and Morgan Stanley as joint global co-ordinators for its planned initial public offering. On 22 February 2021, the company rebranded from TransferWise to Wise. As part of this rebranding, the company also launched a new website domain. The company rebranded to reflect its expanded product offering beyond international money transfer.

On 2 July 2021, it was announced in a prospectus published by the company that co-founder Taavet Hinrikus would step down as chair within a year. It was also announced that David Wells would replace him in this position.

On 7 July 2021, Wise went public with a direct listing on the London Stock Exchange, and was valued at $11 billion.

On 27 June 2022, the Financial Conduct Authority reported that the Wise CEO, Kristo Käärmann, was included on their list of individuals and businesses receiving penalties for a deliberate default regarding their tax affairs. He would remain on the list for 12 months from September 2021.  He reportedly failed to pay £720,000 for the 2017–2018 tax year.

Funding 
Wise received seed funding amounting to $1.3 million from a consortium including venture firms IA Ventures and Index Ventures, IJNR Ventures, NYPPE as well as individual investors such as PayPal co-founder Max Levchin, former Betfair CEO David Yu, and Wonga.com co-founder Errol Damelin. Wise also received investment after being named one of Seedcamp 2011's winners.

In May 2013, it was announced that Wise had secured a $6 million investment round led by Peter Thiel's Valar Ventures. Wise raised a further $25 million in June 2014, adding Richard Branson as an investor.

In January 2015, it was announced that Wise had raised a $58 million Series C round, led by investors Andreessen Horowitz. In May 2016, Wise secured a funding of $26 million. This raised the company's valuation to $1.1 billion. As of May 2016, Wise has raised a total of $117 million in funding.

In November 2017, the company raised a $280 million Series E led by Old Mutual Global Investors and IVP, as well as Sapphire Ventures, Japanese Mitsui & Co, and World Innovation Lab.

In May 2019, the company had the secondary investment round of $292 million and reached the total valuation of $3.5 billion, more than double the valuation Wise achieved in late 2017 at the time of its $280 million Series E round.

In July 2020, the company disclosed a secondary investment round of $319 million and reached the total valuation of $5 billion, led by new investor D1 Capital Partners and existing shareholder Lone Pine Capital. Vulcan Capital also came on board as a new investor, with Baillie Gifford, Fidelity Investments and LocalGlobe adding to their existing holdings.

Criticism 
In May 2016, Wise's claim "you save up to 90% against banks" was called misleading by the UK Advertising Standards Authority.

In June 2020, after experts raised ethical and privacy concerns around the digital COVID-19 immunity passports Wise was helping develop, the company conceded immunity passports were not a "perfect solution" and co-founder Hinrikus said they would not be launched publicly until there was scientific consensus on COVID-19 immunity.

Wise used to be a preferred service for Ukrainian nationals to transfer cash, especially after the Russian attacks to the country, e.g., for supporting relatives that had to flee Ukraine. While other financial institutions kept their operations for Ukraine residents open, Wise suspended the opening of new accounts.

In January 2023 Wise was accused of harming competition in an official letter to the UK Competition and Markets Authority by its competitor Atlantic Money. Wise is said to have removed the cheaper challenger from its international transfers price comparison table for economic reasons. Wise is also alleged to have denied Atlantic Money access to additional comparison sites the firm owns and controls.

References 

Online remittance providers
Companies based in the London Borough of Hackney
Electronic funds transfer
Foreign exchange companies
Estonian inventions
2011 establishments in England
Financial services companies established in 2011
Online financial services companies of the United Kingdom
Software companies of Estonia
Direct stock offerings